Sandro Luiz da Silva or simply Sandro (born 13 March 1983 in Paranaguá – Paraná) is a Brazilian footballer currently playing for Real SC.

References

External links

Sandro at ZeroZero

1983 births
Living people
Brazilian footballers
Brazilian expatriate footballers
Leixões S.C. players
S.C. Olhanense players
F.C. Penafiel players
C.D. Santa Clara players
FC Atyrau players
C.D. Mafra players
Clube Oriental de Lisboa players
Real S.C. players
Kazakhstan Premier League players
Campeonato de Portugal (league) players
Primeira Liga players
Brazilian expatriate sportspeople in Kazakhstan
Brazilian expatriate sportspeople in Portugal
Expatriate footballers in Kazakhstan
Expatriate footballers in Portugal
People from Paranaguá
Association football defenders
Sportspeople from Paraná (state)